Ruth Durlacher (née Dyas; 22 July 1876 – 21 September 1946) was an Irish tennis player. She played in the Wimbledon championships between 1897 and 1907.

Early life 
Durlacher was born Ruth Dyas in Malahide on 22 July 1876. Durlacher was daughter to Jacob Dyas and Sophia Dyas. Durlacher was baptised Protestant (Church of England) on the 16 November 1900 in St. James Paddington. Durlacher had one brother and one older sister. The Durlachers were a wealthy family. Their original family home was Heathstown House. Durlacher grew up in England. She entered her first competition at 18. She married fellow tennis player Neville John Durlacher in Rathdown on 17 December 1898 at the age of 23. They had two children: Patrick Durlacher who was a successful cricket player and Nora Durlacher who was a successful tennis player.

Role in tennis
The Irish Championships were first established in 1879 and took place in Pembroke Place, and it moved on to Wilton Place from 1880 till 1902. Following Wilton Place, the tournament took place in Fitzwilliam Square, where it remained until its final location in 1972 at the Fitzwilliam Lawn Tennis Club in Appian Way, Dublin. It was in this year that the tournament changed its name to the Irish Open due to sponsorship reasons.

As her success grew, she further took part at the Wimbledon championships between 1897 and 1919. Come 1899, Durlacher triumphantly reached the ‘all-comers’ final’ but lost to her opponent Blanche Bingley, who managed to beat her two years prior in the Irish Championships  and who later won six Wimbledon championships.

Durlacher was a finalist four times in the women singles in the Irish Championships , taking place is Fitzwilliam Lawn Tennis Club. In 1897, Blanche Bingley successfully beat Durlacher, 7–5, 2–6, 6–3. Following two years’ time, Louisa Martin won the singles tournament, 6-1, 6-2, against her opponent Durlacher. in 1899, Muriel Robb beat Durlacher in the final, 9-7, 6-1. Louisa Martin beeat Ruth Durlacher in the final in 1902, 6-8, 6-4, 7-5.

Durlacher played in the doubles category of the Irish Championships, and her partners were Alice Pickering in 1896; Mollie Martin in 1898, 1899 and 1901; and Ms.Hazlett in 1902.

Durlacher took part in the mixed doubles under the Irish Open. Kn 1898, Durlacher won the mixed doubles with partner Harold Nisbet. In 1901 and 1902, she won the same title with partner Laurence Doherty.

Tennis career
Durlacher played at the Wimbledon Championships from 1897 to 1907. In 1899, she won the doubles tournament. In singles, Durlacher reached the finals of the all-comers competition, losing to Blanche Bingley. She won the Irish Championships mixed doubles title along with Harold Nisbet in 1898, and with Laurence Doherty 1901 and 1902.

Later life and legacy
She died in Buckingham, Buckinghamshire in 1946. She also played for the Irish golf team in the Women's Home Internationals, being part of the winning team in 1907.

Durlacher played in the Irish Championships in 1895 for the first time when she was 18 years old. Durlacher also played golf for the Irish ladies golf team and played in the Irish Ladies Championships.

References

1876 births
1946 deaths
People from Malahide
Sportspeople from Fingal
British female tennis players
Irish female tennis players